This is a list of human rights articles by country.

Africa 

Citizens of the African nations are provided supranational human rights protection by the African Commission on Human and Peoples' Rights. See also Network of African National Human Rights Institutions.

Asia and Oceania 

 See also the Asia Pacific Forum of National Human Rights Institutions and the ASEAN Intergovernmental Commission on Human Rights.

Europe 

The most powerful human rights organization is the European Court of Human Rights, which is the first international court with jurisdiction to deal with cases brought by individuals (not states). See also European Group of National Human Rights Institutions.

Middle East 
 Several Middle Eastern and North African countries are signatories on the International Covenant on Civil and Political Rights (ICCPR) and the International Covenant on Economic, Social, and Cultural Rights (ICESCR). However, there is no established international, government-operated human rights article or council for the region, due to factors such as cultural and regional conflict.

North And South America 

Citizens of the North And South American nations have degrees of supranational human rights protection from the Inter-American Commission on Human Rights and the Inter-American Court of Human Rights.

See also 
 List of human rights organisations
 List of Linguistic Rights in Constitutions (Africa)
 List of Linguistic Rights in Constitutions (Europe)

References

Human rights articles by country
Human rights articles by country
Human rights articles by country
Human rights by country